The Hurt Business may refer to:

 The Hurt Business (film), 2016 documentary film
 The Hurt Business (professional wrestling), professional wrestling stable in WWE